The HFStival was an annual Washington, D.C. / Baltimore, Maryland rock festival. Held every summer from 1990 through 2006 by radio station WHFS, and held again in 2010 and 2011 in commemoration of the now-defunct station's legacy, the HFStival was at its peak the largest yearly music festival on the East Coast. 55,000 to 90,000 people attended the annual event, which had traditionally been held at RFK Stadium until the station moved to Baltimore in 2005. That May, the new WHFS at 105.7 held its first HFStival at M&T Bank Stadium. Though not originally called HFStival, two earlier concerts held on the Fourth of July were the foundation for the first festival and are considered part of HFStival history.

History

The HFStival began as the WHFS Fourth of July Festival, an all-day concert followed by a fireworks display, which was held twice at Lake Fairfax Park in Reston, Virginia 1990 and 1991. The first proper HFStival was held in Upper Marlboro, Maryland in 1992, and the following year's event, on July 4, 1993, the event was moved to RFK Stadium for the first time, where it would continue annually return for the next six years. In 1993, when the first RFK lineup was revealed, some controversy arose among the station's listeners over the inclusion of the Stereo MCs; the previous events had only included mainstays of rock and alternative music and the MCs, a hip hop group, seemed out of place. Once the concert went on, however, the audience's enthusiasm paved the way for WHFS to include more artists from outside the station's normal playlist on the HFStival's stages – which would, in future years, include more hip hop acts, electronica artists, and such disparate musicians as crooner Tony Bennett and performance artists the Blue Man Group.

HFStival 1999, headlined by Red Hot Chili Peppers, left RFK Stadium for the larger M & T Bank Stadium in Baltimore, Maryland; the following year's festival was held at FedExField in Landover, Maryland, and, with a sold-out crowd of 90,000, it was WHFS's most-attended concert ever. RFK was still the festival's official home, however – not only would the festival return in 2001, but in September, 1999, the first "HFStival Fall Edition" was held there.

2000 is generally considered the HFStival's peak year – that year's concert, headlined by Rage Against the Machine and Stone Temple Pilots with a half-hour documentary produced by Washington, DC, based TV station MHz Networks and hosted by WHFS on-air personalities – would be the last to sell out on the initial day of sale, and attendance has gradually declined since. However, the strong ticket sales of the previous few years' festivals inspired the station to expand the HFStival, beginning in 2001, into a two-day event; between May 27 and May 28, over forty artists took the stage and, in 2002, the two-day formula was repeated to similar success.

On the first night of HFStival 2002, during a performance by Eminem, several members of the audience were injured when the crowd surged forward as the rapper took the stage. When the fans refused to obey his instructions to move back, the performance was suspended, allowing security and first aid personnel to act. The injured people removed from the crowd included five who required hospitalization and one man who suffered a heart attack. The incident cast doubt on whether the event, or the second day, would be allowed to continue – especially in light of the negative publicity the venue received when a concertgoer was hospitalized after a lightning strike at the 1998 Tibetan Freedom Concert. However, Eminem's performance, the following DJ set, and Day 2 of the festival eventually went on as planned.

Lagging ticket sales seemed to threaten the festival's future for a while, first when it was reduced for 2003 from two days back to one, and again when a planned second Fall Edition was cancelled – a scheduling conflict required a change of date and venue, and several big-name artists were forced to pull out, severely affecting ticket sales. Finally, in early 2005, the station abruptly went off the air, replaced by a Spanish language Latin pop format, and listeners feared the HFStival's days had come to an end. Shortly afterward, parent company Infinity Broadcasting revived WHFS with a new frequency and a new city and, with it, brought the HFStival back. HFStival 2005, held at Baltimore's M&T Bank Stadium, was notably different from previous affairs, featuring a lineup of artists from all points of the station's long history: original punk rockers The New York Dolls shared a stage with hard rock icon Billy Idol, veteran alternative band They Might Be Giants, and current rising stars like The Bravery. Approximately 53,000 seats were filled – nearly equivalent to a sold-out RFK Stadium.

The 2006 HFStival was held the weekend of May 27 and May 28, 2006, at Merriweather Post Pavilion in Columbia, Maryland, which more than doubled its normal capacity in order to accommodate the event's more than 40,000 attendees over the weekend event. The Pavilion's amphitheatre-style main stage featured the event's headlining artists, with the two additional stages located in the parking lot and in the surrounding woods. Despite being advertised up until a week before the event, the "Buzz Tent", a dance / DJ area, was cancelled shortly beforehand.

In early 2007, WHFS was rebranded "Baltimore's FM Talk", splitting off nearly all music to its HD radio channel HFS2. No official information came forth from the station regarding the HFStival, except for an announcement that it would be held in 2007.  The only artist confirmed to perform was local metalcore band aFREUDIANSLIP, winners of the station's "Road to the Festival" band competition.  The 2007 concert was not held.

The 2010 HFStival was held on September 18, 2010, at Merriweather Post Pavilion in Columbia, Maryland. The 2011 edition of the event took place on September 17, again at Merriweather Post Pavilion.

Lineups
Lineups are listed in reverse order, with the first band listed playing last.

 The cancelled 2003 Fall Edition was to have featured Limp Bizkit, Staind, O.A.R., Yellowcard, Jet, Deftones, The Black Eyed Peas, Rancid, Thrice, Black Rebel Motorcycle Club, Eve 6, Three Days Grace, Citizen Cope, Electric Six, Interpol, and SR-71. Duran Duran was also scheduled to appear, but the event was cancelled before they were announced.

See also
 List of HFStival performers
 Music of Maryland
 KROQ Weenie Roast

References

External links
 WHFS2 HD Radio
 HFStival.com

Festivals in Washington, D.C.
Music of Washington, D.C.
Rock festivals in the United States
Music festivals in Maryland
Music festivals established in 1990
Festivals in Baltimore